"Phoner to Arizona" is the opening track from Gorillaz's iPad recorded album  The Fall. The song is an instrumental that was recorded entirely on Gorillaz co-founder Damon Albarn's Apple iPad during the American leg of the Escape to Plastic Beach World Tour in October 2010. The "Phoner to Arizona" video—a compilation of footage and images taken from the tour and the phase—was posted on YouTube on 22 December as a way to promote the album.

Personnel
Damon Albarn – vocals
Stephen Sedgwick – mixing engineer, recording engineer
Geoff Pesche – mastering engineer

References

2010 songs
Gorillaz songs
Instrumentals
Songs written by Damon Albarn
Techno songs